The nineteenth cycle of America's Next Top Model (subtitled as America's Next Top Model: College Edition), consisted of thirteen episodes and was broadcast on The CW. It aired from August 24, 2012, until November 16, 2012, and was promoted by the catchphrase "Only One Can Be Top of the Class". This was the final season to feature thirteen contestants, all of whom were enrolled in higher education, compete for the title of America's Next Top Model, providing them with an opportunity to begin their career in the modeling industry. Its premise was originated with model Tyra Banks, who additionally serves as its executive producer and presenter.

The international destination during the cycle was Ocho Rios, Jamaica, becoming the second occasion in which the series traveled to the country, after cycle 3.

The winner of the competition was 21-year-old Paul Smith's College student Laura James from Cambridge, New York with Kiara Belen placing as the runner up.

Format changes

Casting
This was the first season to feature a cast of all-new contestants since Cycle 16 (Cycle 17 (All-Stars) featured only returning contestants from previous cycles, while Cycle 18 (British Invasion) featured seven new American models alongside seven returning contestants from previous cycles of Britain's Next Top Model). This is also the last season to feature only female contestants until Cycle 23.

Judges
Judge and fashion photographer Nigel Barker, runway coach Miss J. Alexander and photo shoot creative director Jay Manuel were dismissed from the show after the previous cycle in an attempt to revitalize the show. They were replaced by British model Rob Evans and Filipino fashion blogger Bryanboy. Johnny Wujek also joined the crew as the new creative director of photo shoots. Evans and Bryanboy joined the judging panel with Banks and Cutrone, marking the return of four permanent judges since cycle 12. This cycle did not feature guest judges at panel

Public voting
Another change was the incorporation of public voting as a factor in eliminations. A 1–10 scoring system was implemented to determine the merits of each contestant's performances at challenges and photo shoots, and the results for each week were calculated on a 50-point scale, with a maximum possible score of 10 from each of the three judges (Banks, Cutrone and Evans) and for each challenge and a maximum possible average social media score of 10.0. Each week, the girl with the lowest combined score was eliminated from the competition.

Comeback series 
The eliminated girls still participated in every photo shoot (including those taking place after the comeback competition was finished), and their photos were also still available to be voted on by the public. This separate competition was documented on the "Comeback series", which was untelevised and instead shown on The CW's official website. It lasted for six weeks, and the winning contestant, with the highest average social media score throughout the cycle (Leila Goldkuhl), was allowed to rejoin the main competition.

Prizes
The prizes for this cycle were a modeling contract with LA Models and NY Model Management, a position the face of the America’s Next Top Model fragrance Dream Come True, a fashion spread in Nylon magazine, campaigns with Nine West and Smashbox cosmetics and a $100,000 cash prize. The following prizes were removed: A position as guest correspondent for Extra, a fashion spread in Vogue Italia, a cover of and fashion spread in Beauty In Vogue, a single produced and released by CBS Records and a 100,000 contract with CoverGirl cosmetics, the series' long-time sponsor.

Contestants
The cast includes Laura James, who is the daughter of Dynasty actor John James.

(ages stated are at start of contest)

Episodes
No episode aired on October 12 due to the network's re-airing of the pilot episode of Arrow.

Comeback series
For this cycle, America's Next Top Model launched a web-series called The Comeback Series. After being eliminated, the girls continued to participate in the photo shoots under the premise that the audience would select one of them to return to the competition later. Leila returned to the competition in episode 9 for having accumulated the highest average fan score for her photographs.

Summaries

Results

 The contestant won the challenge
 The contestant was eliminated
 The contestant failed to return to the competition
 The contestant returned to the competition
 The contestant won the competition
 The contestant quit the competition

Bottom two

 The contestant was eliminated after their first time in the bottom two
 The contestant was eliminated after their second time in the bottom two
 The contestant was eliminated after their third time in the bottom two
 The contestant was eliminated in the final judging and placed third.
 The contestant was eliminated in the final judging and placed second.

Average  call-out order
Casting call-out order and final three are not included.

Scoring chart

 Indicates the contestant won the competition.
 The contestant received the highest score of the week
 The contestant was eliminated
 The contestant was in the bottom two
 The contestant quit the competition

Photo shoot guide

 Episode 1 photo shoot: Posing in bikinis (casting)
 Episode 2 photo shoot: Taxidermy mounted head beauty shots
 Episode 3 photo shoot: Black and white nude in a garden with Rob Evans
 Episode 4 photo shoot: Apocalyptic zombies
 Episode 5 photo shoot: Cheerleaders in the air
 Episode 6 photo shoot: Steampunk fashion with an owl on a train
 Episode 7 photo shoot: Gross and sticky situations in a motel
 Episode 8 photo shoot: Prison mugshots
 Episode 9 photo shoot: River raft love triangle
 Episode 10 photo shoot: Waterfall warriors
 Episode 11 photo shoot: Dream Come True fragrance in a beach
 Episode 12 photo shoots: Nine West advertisements; Nylon Magazine spreads

Makeovers

 Maria – Refused makeover (planned for curly layered hair with highlights)
 Darian – Long layered brown weave
 Destiny – Cut short with caramel highlights
 Yvonne – Long black extensions 
 Allyssa – Dyed darker
 Brittany – Bob cut and dyed light red
 Victoria – Refused makeover (planned for red, long, curly extensions)
 Kristin – Shoulder length cut with bangs
 Nastasia – Volumized curls and lightened
 Leila – Dyed brown with blonde highlights
 Kiara – Long black extensions with fixed eyebrows
 Laura – Dyed ice blonde with bleached eyebrows

Notes

References

America's Next Top Model
2012 American television seasons
Television shows filmed in California
Television shows filmed in Jamaica